Dick Roberts may refer to:

 Dick Roberts (musician) (1897–1966), banjo and guitar player
 Dick Roberts (footballer, born 1878) (1878–1931), English football winger
 Dick Roberts (footballer, born 1891) (1891–?), Welsh football left back
 Dick Roberts (rugby union) (1889–1973), New Zealand rugby union player

See also 
 Richard Roberts (disambiguation)
 Rick Roberts (disambiguation)
 Dickie Roberts: Former Child Star, a 2003 American comedy film